Sdoos Club  is a Saudi Arabian football (soccer) team in Sdoos city playing at the Saudi Fourth Division.

Stadium
Currently the team plays at the 3000 capacity Al Sayeg Stadium.

Honours
Saudi First Division (Level 2)
Winners (1): 1998–99

Notable players
Mohammed Manga
Bader Al-Khamees
Faisal Al-Merqeb
Ahmed Hebh
Mohammed Al-Khojali
Abdulaziz Al-Janoubi
Abdulrahman Al-Ajlan
Khalid Sharhili
Abdulaziz Al-Yousef
Rabee Al-Mousa
Abdulaziz Al-Abduassalam
Yahia Al-Shehri

References

External links
Soccerway
Futbol24.com 
Goal.com

Football clubs in Saudi Arabia